Capão Redondo is a metro station on Line 5 (Lilac) of the São Paulo Metro in the Capão Redondo district of São Paulo, Brazil and is the western terminus.

SPTrans lines
The following SPTrans bus lines can be accessed. Passengers may use a Bilhete Único card for transfer:

EMTU lines
The following EMTU bus lines can be accessed:

References

São Paulo Metro stations
Railway stations opened in 2002